Timofey or Timofei is a male Russian first name, derived from the Ancient Greek ""—Timotheos, "honoring a god". Timofey is a Russian variation of the name Timothy.  

The male patronymic derived from this name is Timofeyevich, and the female form is Timofeyevna.

List
The name is shared by the following individuals:

 Timofey Chalyy (born 1994), Russian athlete specialising in the 400 metres hurdles
 Timofey Granovsky (1813–1855), founder of medieval studies in the Russian Empire
 Timofey Khryukin (1910–1953), Soviet aviator
 Timofey Kiryanov (born 1970), Russian football player
 Timofey Kritsky (born 1987), Russian road cyclist
 Timofey Lapshin (born 1988), Russian biathlete
 Timofey Lebeshev (1905–1981), Soviet cinematographer
 Timofey Mikhaylov (1859–1881), Russian boiler maker and assassin
 Timofey Mozgov (born 1986), Russian basketball player
 Timofey Prokofiev (1913–1944), Soviet marine infantryman
 Timofey Samsonov (1888–1955), Soviet politician and veteran of the Russian Civil War
 Timofey Skryabin (born 1967), Soviet boxer

See also
, a Russian icebreaking tanker
Timothy (name)
Timur (name)

Russian masculine given names